Rieneke Terink (born 13 March 1984, Hengelo, Gelderland) is a Dutch swimmer who mainly specializes in freestyle and medley. She is currently training under the guidance of Fedor Hes alongside Robin van Aggele. Since December 21, 2008 she is the national record holder in the 400 m short course individual medley.

Swimming career
Rieneke made her international debut at the 2006 European Aquatics Championships in Budapest, Hungary where she started in the 4×200 m freestyle relay which was eliminated in the heats. She also took part in the time-trials of the 2008 European Aquatics Championships. She failed to qualify for the Olympics in the 200 m freestyle and 4×200 m freestyle relay.

At the National Short Course Championships, in December 2008, she swam her first national record, in the 400 m individual medley.

Personal bests

See also
List of Dutch records in swimming

References

1984 births
Living people
Dutch female freestyle swimmers
Dutch female medley swimmers
People from Bronckhorst
Sportspeople from Gelderland
21st-century Dutch women